This is a list of articles in philosophy of religion.

 A Grief Observed
 A History of God
 A Letter Concerning Toleration
 A New Model of the Universe
 A Secular Humanist Declaration
 A. H. Almaas
 Abandonment (existentialism)
 Abd al-Karīm ibn Hawāzin al-Qushayri
 Abhidharma
 Abraham Joshua Heschel
 Absolute (philosophy)
 Absolute atheism
 Absolute Infinite
 Abstinence
 Abu'l Hasan Muhammad Ibn Yusuf al-'Amiri
 Abu Sulayman al-Sijistani
 Accidentalism
 Acosmism
 Actus purus
 Adevism
 Adi Shankara
 Adriaan Koerbagh
 Afshin Ellian
 Afterlife
 Age of Enlightenment
 Agnostic atheism
 Agnostic theism
 Agnosticism
 Ahimsa
 Ahmad Sirhindi
 Al-Farabi
 Al-Ghazali
 Al-Kindi
 Al-Shahrastani
 Al-Tabarani
 Al-Zamakhshari
 Albrecht Ritschl
 Alice von Hildebrand
 All Truth Is God's Truth
 Aloysius Martinich
 Alvin Plantinga
 Alvin Plantinga's free-will defense
 American Catholic Philosophical Quarterly
 Amsterdam Declaration
 An Intelligent Person's Guide to Atheism
 Anāgāmi
 Analects
 Analytical Thomism
 Ananda Coomaraswamy
 Anantarika-karma
 Anarchism and Islam
 Anatta
 Anava
 Anders Nygren
 Anekantavada
 Animals in Buddhism
 Anselm of Canterbury
 Answer to Job
 Anthony Kenny
 Anthony Thiselton
 Anthropopath
 Anti-clericalism
 Anti-communism
 Anti-Supernaturalism
 Antihumanism
 Antireligion
 Antitheism
 Anton Kržan
 Anton LaVey
 Apatheism
 Apocalypticism
 Apologetics
 Argument from a proper basis
 Argument from beauty
 Argument from consciousness
 Argument from degree
 Argument from desire
 Argument from free will
 Argument from inconsistent revelations
 Argument from love
 Argument from miracles
 Argument from morality
 Argument from nonbelief
 Argument from poor design
 Argument from religious experience
 Arhat
 Aristotelian view of a god
 Arya
 Ashtamangala
 Atheism
 Atheist's Wager
 Atheist existentialism
 Ātman (Buddhism)
 Augustine of Hippo
 Avadhuta Gita
 Averroes
 Avidyā (Buddhism)
 Avraham son of Rambam
 Ayatana
 Ayyavazhi phenomenology
 Baptists in the history of separation of church and state
 Bardo
 Basic Points Unifying the Theravāda and the Mahāyāna
 Beatific vision
 Best of all possible worlds
 Beyond Belief: Science, Religion, Reason and Survival
 Bhagavad Gita
 Bhava
 Bhumi (Buddhism)
 Biblical literalism
 Bilocation
 Biosophy
 Bodhi
 Bodhimandala
 Bodhisattva Precepts
 Brahmacharya
 Brahman
 Brahmavihara
 Brian Davies (philosopher)
 Brights movement
 British Humanist Association
 Bruno Bauer
 Buddha-nature
 Buddhism and evolution
 Buddhist philosophy
 C. S. Lewis
 C. S. Lewis bibliography
 C. Stephen Evans
 Cappadocian Fathers
 Catholic guilt
 Celsus
 Charles Blount (deist)
 Chöd
 Chovot ha-Levavot
 Christian de Quincey
 Christian existentialism
 Christian humanism
 Christian materialism
 Christian philosophy
 Christian Realism
 Christianity and environmentalism
 Christological argument
 City of God (book)
 Classical theism
 Clemens Timpler
 Clement of Alexandria
 Clerical philosophers
 Clericalism
 Committee for the Scientific Examination of Religion
 Confucius
 Consciousness-only
 Contemporary Islamic philosophy
 Continuum of Humanist Education
 Contra Celsum
 Cosmological argument
 Cosmology (metaphysics)
 Counter-Enlightenment
 Creationism
 Credo ut intelligam
 Criticism of Christianity
 Criticism of Hinduism
 Criticism of Islam
 Criticism of Jesus
 Criticism of Judaism
 Criticism of monotheism
 Criticism of religion
 Criticism of the Bible
 Criticism of the Catholic Church
 Criticism of the Latter Day Saint movement
 Criticism of the Qur'an
 Cultural materialism (anthropology)
 Cultural materialism (cultural studies)
 Curt John Ducasse
 Daniel Rynhold
 Dariush Shayegan
 Darwiniana
 David ben Merwan al-Mukkamas
 David Braine (philosopher)
 David Ray Griffin
 David Strauss
 De Coelesti Hierarchia
 De divisione naturae
 De Mysteriis Aegyptiorum
 Dean Zimmerman (philosopher)
 Death
 Decline of Greco-Roman polytheism
 Deism
 Demiurge
 Derech Hashem
 Desacralization of knowledge
 Desire realm
 Deus
 Dharani
 Dharma
 Dharma transmission
 Dharmakāya
 Dharmarāja Adhvarin
 Diamond Realm
 Dietrich von Hildebrand
 Dimitrije Mitrinović
 Dipolar theism
 Direct revelation
 Distributism
 Divine apathy
 Divine command theory
 Divine simplicity
 Divinity
 Dōgen
 Dogma
 Doomsday argument
 Doomsday cult
 Doomsday event
 Double-mindedness
 Dukkha
 Dwight H. Terry Lectureship
 Dzogchen
 E. David Cook
 Early Islamic philosophy
 Eliminative materialism
 Elizabeth Burns (philosopher)
 Emergent materialism
 Epistemic theory of miracles
 Epistle to Yemen
 Eranos
 Ernesto Buonaiuti
 Ernst Ehrlich
 Ernst Troeltsch
 Eschatology
 Essentially contested concept
 Eternal Buddha
 Eternal return
 Eternal return (Eliade)
 Ethica thomistica
 Ethical will
 Ethics in religion
 Étienne Tempier
 Eugen Rosenstock-Huessy
 Euthyphro dilemma
 Evolutionary argument against naturalism
 Evolutionary Humanism
 Exegesis
 Existence of God
 Extrinsic finality
 Faith
 Faith and rationality
 Faith, Science and Understanding
 Faraday Institute for Science and Religion
 Fate of the unlearned
 Fazang
 Fazlur Rahman Malik
 Ferdinand Ebner
 Fetter (Buddhism)
 Fi Zilal al-Qur'an
 Fideism
 Fiqh
 Five hindrances
 Four stages of enlightenment
 Fourteen unanswerable questions
 Francis Schaeffer
 Franciszek Krupiński
 Françoise Meltzer
 Franz Rosenzweig
 Frederick Ferré
 Freethought
 French law on secularity and conspicuous religious symbols in schools
 Friedrich Nietzsche and free will
 Friedrich von Hügel
 Friedrich Wilhelm Joseph Schelling
 Fujiwara Seika
 Fundamentalism
 Gary Habermas
 Gaudapada
 George H. Smith
 Gifford Lectures
 Giles Fraser
 God
 God-Building
 God in Buddhism
 God Is Not Great
 God of the gaps
 God, A Guide for the Perplexed
 Gödel's ontological proof
 Good and necessary consequence
 Graham Oppy
 Great chain of being
 Greek hero cult
 Gregory of Nyssa
 Guru Nanak Dev
 Gustav Glogau
 Hajime Tanabe
 Han Yong-un
 Hans Rookmaaker
 Haribhadra
 Hasidic philosophy
 Hayashi Razan
 Hayom Yom
 Henosis
 Henry Corbin
 Herbert McCabe
 Hermetica
 Hermeticism
 Hierophany
 Hinayana
 Hirata Atsutane
 Hisbah
 Historical materialism
 Holy History of Mankind
 Homoiousian
 Homoousian
 Hōnen
 Hossein Nasr
 Hossein Ziai
 Huayan school
 Huineng
 Human beings in Buddhism
 Human extinction
 Humanism
 Humanism and Its Aspirations
 Humanism in France
 Humanism in Germany
 Humanist Manifesto
 Humanist Manifesto I
 Humanist Manifesto II
 Humanist Movement
 Humanist Society Scotland
 Humanistic naturalism
 Huston Smith
 Ian Ramsey
 Ibn al-Nafis
 Ibn Arabi
 Ietsism
 Ignosticism
 Illtyd Trethowan
 Illuminationism
 Illuminationist philosophy
 Immanence
 Immortality
 Impermanence
 Incarnational humanism
 Incompatible-properties argument
 Indefinite monism
 Indriya
 Ineffability
 Infinite qualitative distinction
 Inka
 Institute for the Secularisation of Islamic Society
 Integral humanism (India)
 Intellectualism
 International League of Humanists
 Intrinsic finality
 Intuition (knowledge)
 Invincible error
 Invincible ignorance fallacy
 Inviolability
 Invisible Pink Unicorn
 Ippen
 Irenaean theodicy
 Irreligion
 Is God Dead?
 Islam and democracy
 Islamic fundamentalism in Iran
 Islamic philosophy
 Ivan Aguéli
 Ivan Vyshenskyi
 J. J. C. Smart
 J. P. Moreland
 Jainism
 Jakob Guttmann (rabbi)
 Jakub of Gostynin
 James Gustafson
 Jay Newman
 Jayarāśi Bhaṭṭa
 Jayatirtha
 Jean Meslier
 Jewish ethics
 Jinul
 Jiva Goswami
 Jizang
 Johann Friedrich Flatt
 Johann Joachim Lange
 Johann Nepomuk Oischinger
 Johannes Scotus Eriugena
 John Calvin
 John E. Hare
 John Hick
 John of Głogów
 Joseph de Torre
 Joseph Priestley and Dissent
 Joseph Runzo
 Kalam cosmological argument
 Kalpa (aeon)
 Kammaṭṭhāna
 Kancha Ilaiah
 Kang Youwei
 Karl Heinrich Heydenreich
 Karl Jaspers
 Karma
 Karma in Buddhism
 Karuṇā
 Keith Ward
 Kensho
 Kersey Graves
 Kitaro Nishida
 Klaus Klostermaier
 Knight of faith
 Kol HaTor
 Kūkai
 Kumārila Bhaṭṭa
 Kurt Almqvist
 Kuzari
 Lazarus Geiger
 Lectures on the Philosophy of Religion
 Letter to a Christian Nation
 Letters to a Philosophical Unbeliever
 Lewis's trilemma
 Life of Jesus (Hegel)
 Likkutei Sichos
 Lineage (Buddhism)
 Linji school
 List of female mystics
 List of new religious movements
 Logic in Islamic philosophy
 Lutheran scholasticism
 Macrocosm and microcosm
 Madhusūdana Sarasvatī
 Madhvacharya
 Mahābhūta
 Mahamudra
 Mahavira
 Mahayana
 Manas-vijnana
 Mandala
 Mappō
 Martin Luther
 Materialism
 Maximus the Confessor
 Maya (illusion)
 Meera Nanda
 Meister Eckhart
 Melville Y. Stewart
 Merit (Buddhism)
 Mesillat Yesharim
 Metaphysical naturalism
 Metempsychosis
 Methodios Anthrakites
 Michael Gottlieb Birckner
 Michael Martin (philosopher)
 Michael Oakeshott
 Michael Ruse
 Middle Way
 Mind's eye
 Mindstream
 Miracle of the roses
 Mircea Eliade
 Mircea Eliade bibliography
 Misotheism
 Monad (Greek philosophy)
 Monism
 Monistic idealism
 Morality without religion
 Muhammad Husayn Tabatabaei
 Muhammad ibn Muhammad Tabrizi
 Muhammad ibn Zakariya al-Razi
 Muhammad Iqbal
 Mulla Sadra
 Mumbo Jumbo (phrase)
 Mystical philosophy of antiquity
 Mystical realism
 Mystical theology
 Mysticism
 Myth of Er
 Nagarjuna
 Namarupa
 National Federation of Atheist, Humanist and Secular Student Societies
 National Secular Society
 Natural theology
 Naturalism (philosophy)
 Naturalistic pantheism
 Nemesius
 Neo-Scholasticism
 Neo-theocracy
 Neoplatonism and Christianity
 Neutral monism
 New Age
 New religious movement
 New Thought
 Nichiren
 Nicholas of Kues
 Nick Trakakis
 Nikolai Lossky
 Nimbarka
 Nirvana
 Noble Eightfold Path
 Nondualism
 Nontheism
 Nontheist Friend
 Norman Geisler
 Numenius of Apamea
 Nyaya
 Obscurantism
 Occasion of sin
 Occasionalism
 Odium theologicum
 Of Miracles
 Olavo de Carvalho
 Omega Point
 Omnibenevolence
 Omnipotence
 Omnipotence paradox
 Omnipresence
 Omniscience
 Omphalos hypothesis
 Ontological argument
 Ontotheology
 Opium of the people
 Or Adonai
 Orchot Tzaddikim
 Orlando J. Smith
 Osvaldo Lira
 Outline of humanism
 Outline of theology
 Over-soul
 Pandeism
 Pantheism
 Pantheism controversy
 Parallelism (philosophy)
 Paramartha
 Pāramitā
 Pascal's Wager
 Patañjali
 Paul Draper (philosopher)
 Paul Häberlin
 Paul J. Griffiths
 Perennial philosophy
 Personalism
 Peter Abelard
 Peter Geach
 Peter Kreeft
 Peter Millican
 Peter van Inwagen
 Phenomenological definition of God
 Phenomenology of religion
 Phillip H. Wiebe
 Philo's view of God
 Philodemus
 Philosophical Foundations of Marxist-Leninist Atheism
 Philosophical theism
 Philosophical theology
 Philosophy of religion
 Philotheus Boehner
 Pierre Cally
 Political theology
 Politics Drawn from the Very Words of Holy Scripture
 Postmodern Christianity
 Praepositinus
 Pragmatism
 Pratītyasamutpāda
 Pratyekabuddha
 Precept
 Preformation theory
 Preformationism
 Primum movens
 Prince Shōtoku
 Problem of evil
 Problem of evil in Hinduism
 Problem of Hell
 Problem of why there is anything at all
 Process theology
 Proof of the Truthful
 Proslogion
 Protestant work ethic
 Pseudo-Dionysius the Areopagite
 Pseudo-secularism
 Pseudo atheism
 Pseudoreligion
 Psychoanalysis and Religion
 Quantum mysticism
 Quietism (Christian philosophy)
 Quinque viae
 R. De Staningtona
 Rabia al-Adawiyya
 Rabindranath Tagore
 Ralph Tyler Flewelling
 Ramanuja
 Rational fideism
 Rational mysticism
 Rational Response Squad
 Real atheism
 Reality in Buddhism
 Rebirth (Buddhism)
 Reformational philosophy
 Relationship between religion and science
 Religion
 Religion & Ethics Newsweekly
 Religion and abortion
 Religion and happiness
 Religious communism
 Religious democracy
 Religious humanism
 Religious intellectualism in Iran
 Religious interpretation
 Religious interpretations of the Big Bang theory
 Religious law
 Religious naturalism
 Religious philosophy
 Religious skepticism
 Religious views on business ethics
 Religious views on suicide
 Rémi Brague
 Renaissance humanism
 René Guénon
 Revelation
 Richard Carrier
 Richard Dawkins
 Richard Swinburne
 Rigpa
 Robert Cummings Neville
 Robert Merrihew Adams
 Rudolf Otto
 Rudolf Seydel
 Rule of Three (Wiccan)
 Sakadagami
 Sam Harris (author)
 Sambhogakāya
 Saṃsāra
 Saṃsāra (Buddhism)
 Samuel Maximilian Rieser
 Samvriti
 Sarah Coakley
 Sarvepalli Radhakrishnan
 Sathya Sai Baba
 Sayyid al-Qimni
 Sayyid Qutb
 Scandal (theology)
 School of Saint Victor
 Science and Christian Belief
 Scotism
 Secular ethics
 Secular humanism
 Secular saint
 Secular theology
 Secularism
 Secularism in the Middle East
 Secularization
 Sefer ha-Ikkarim
 Sefer ha-Qabbalah
 Seiichi Hatano
 Self-Indication Assumption Doomsday argument rebuttal
 Self-referencing doomsday argument rebuttal
 Sentences
 Seosan
 Seth Material
 Seven Factors of Enlightenment
 Shahab al-Din Suhrawardi
 Sharia
 Shem Mishmuel
 Shinran
 Shoshin
 Sin
 Skandha
 Societas Perfecta
 Søren Kierkegaard
 Sotāpanna
 Soul
 Soul dualism
 Spirit
 Spiritual materialism
 Spiritual philosophy
 Sri Aurobindo
 Stephen Mulhall
 Stephen R. L. Clark
 Strong agnosticism
 Submission (2004 film)
 Sufi metaphysics
 Sufi philosophy
 Summa
 Summa contra Gentiles
 Summa Theologica
 Śūnyatā
 Supreme Being
 Sureśvara
 Suzuki Shōsan
 Syed Ali Abbas Jallapuri
 Symbolism
 Tage Lindbom
 Taha Abdurrahman
 Tanya
 Tao
 Taoism
 Tathāgata
 Tathagatagarbha doctrine
 Tathātā/Dharmatā
 Tawhid
 Teleological argument
 Teleology
 Ten Commandments
 Ten spiritual realms
 Tetrad (Greek philosophy)
 Thaumaturgy
 The Age of Reason
 The Case for God
 The End of Faith
 The Essence of Christianity
 The Freethinker (journal)
 The God Delusion
 The God Makers
 The God Makers II
 The Guide for the Perplexed
 The Incoherence of the Philosophers
 The Necessity of Atheism
 The Only Possible Argument in Support of a Demonstration of the Existence of God
 The Reconstruction of Religious Thought in Islam
 The Teachings of the Mystics
 The True Word
 Theism
 Theistic realism
 Theodicy
 Theodore Drange
 Theognostus of Alexandria
 Theological aesthetics
 Theological determinism
 Theological noncognitivism
 Theological veto
 Theological virtues
 Theologico-Political Treatise
 Theology
 Theories of religion
 Theosophy (history of philosophy)
 Theurgy
 Thirtha prabandha
 Thomas Aquinas
 Thomas Aquinas and the Sacraments
 Thomas Jefferson
 Thomism
 Thought of Thomas Aquinas
 Thoughtform
 Three marks of existence
 Threefold Training
 Time and Eternity (philosophy book)
 Tomer Devorah
 Trademark argument
 Traditionalist School
 Trailokya
 Transcendence (religion)
 Transcendental argument for the existence of God
 Transtheistic
 Triad (Greek philosophy)
 Trikaya
 True-believer syndrome
 Turtles all the way down
 Twelve Nidānas
 Two truths doctrine
 Types of Buddha
 Ultimate Boeing 747 gambit
 Ultimate fate of the universe
 Universality (philosophy)
 Unmoved mover
 Upanishads
 Upaya
 Upeksa
 Vācaspati Miśra
 Varadaraja V. Raman
 Vasubandhu
 Victoria Institute
 Vijnanabhiksu
 Vincent Miceli
 Vipāka
 Vipassanā
 Vipassana movement
 Voluntarism (theology)
 Vyasa
 Walter of St Victor
 Wang Chong
 War of Anti-Christ with the Church and Christian Civilization
 Watchmaker analogy
 Weak agnosticism
 What I Believe
 Why I Am Not a Christian
 Willem B. Drees
 William Alston
 William F. Vallicella
 William James
 William L. Rowe
 William Lane Craig
 Witness argument
 Wolfgang Smith
 Womb Realm
 Wonhyo
 Works by Thomas Aquinas
 Works of Madhvacharya
 Yamazaki Ansai
 Yi Hwang
 Yunmen Wenyan
 Zhentong
 Zhu Xi
 Zofia Zdybicka

 1
Religion